Two Men of the Desert (also known as Two Men on the Desert and Two Men in a Desert) is a 1913 American  short silent Western film written and directed by D. W. Griffith. Based on a story by Jack London, the film was shot on location in Death Valley. Two Men of the Desert is now presumed lost.

Cast
 Blanche Sweet as The Authoress
 Henry B. Walthall as First Partner
 Walter Miller as Second Partner
 Alfred Paget as An Indian
 Jennie Lee as Old Indian Woman
 Harry Carey
 Donald Crisp
 Charles Hill Mailes
 Mae Marsh
 Marshall Neilan

See also
 Harry Carey filmography
 D. W. Griffith filmography

References

External links
 

1913 films
1913 short films
1913 Western (genre) films
1913 lost films
American silent short films
American black-and-white films
Biograph Company films
Films directed by D. W. Griffith
Films based on American novels
Films shot in California
Films with screenplays by Stanner E.V. Taylor
Films with screenplays by D. W. Griffith
Films based on works by Jack London
Lost Western (genre) films
Lost American films
Silent American Western (genre) films
1910s American films
1910s English-language films